Zayd ibn al-Khaṭṭāb (Arabic: زيد بن الخطاب) (died 632) was a companion of the Islamic prophet Muḥammad and a brother of Umar ibn al-Khattab, the second Islamic caliph.

Biography
He was the son of al-Khattab ibn Nufayl, a member of the Adi clan of the Quraysh tribe in Mecca, and of Asma bint Wahb of the Asad tribe. He was older than his brother Umar. He is described as "a very tall dark man".

He gave his brother Umar a chance to go with Quraysh's trade caravan and trade with Syria's traders and always showed kindness and love to him.

He became a Muslim sometime before August 616. He joined the general emigration to Medina in 622 and was made the brother in Islam of Ma'n ibn Adi.

His wife Habibah (Jamilah) bint Abi 'Amir was from the 'Amr clan of the Aws tribe in Medina; she bore him a daughter, Asma, but the marriage probably ended in divorce. Habibah's niece Jamila was briefly married to Zayd's brother Umar. Zayd's marriage to his cousin, 'Atikah bint Zayd, was childless and also ended in divorce. In Medina he married Lubabah, the daughter of Abu Lubaba ibn Abd al-Mundhir, also from the 'Amr clan of Aws, who was the mother of his son 'Abdulrahman.

He fought at the Battle of Badr, the Battle of Uhud, the Battle of the Ditch and "all the battles with Allah's Messenger". At Uhud Umar urged Zayd to borrow his armour. Zayd put it on but then he took it off again, saying, "I want what you want for yourself."

At the Battle of Yamama on December 632, Zayd carried the Muslims' standard. When Muslim baggage was exposed to plunder by the enemy, Zayd said, "As for the baggage, there is no baggage! As for the men, there are no men!" Then he shouted, "O Allah, I apologise for the flight of my companions! I am not guilty before Thee of what Musaylimah and Muhakkam have done!" Zayd continued to hold the standard while fighting with his sword and he did not drop it until he was killed. His killer was Abu Maryam al-Hanafi, who claimed: "Allah honoured him at my hand and did not weaken me at  his hand." He was martyred seconds after his second cousins, Abdullah ibn Suhail and Abu Hudhayfa ibn 'Utba, and adopted distant relative (possibly nephew), Salim Mawla Abu Hudhayfa.

His tomb in Uyaynah was a site of veneration until around 1740 when Muhammad ibn Abd al-Wahhab campaigned to have it leveled.

See also
Family tree of Umar
Sahaba

References

Year of birth unknown
632 deaths
Sahabah killed in battle
Banu Adi